Nunavakanuk Lake is a lake in the Yukon Delta of Kusilvak Census Area, Alaska, United States. The lake's name is Eskimo in origin. At an elevation of  it is, or near, the lowest point in the state of Alaska.

External links

Lakes of Alaska
Bodies of water of Kusilvak Census Area, Alaska